Relatively few place names in the United States have names of German origin, unlike Spanish or French names. Many of the German town names are in the Midwest, due to high German settlement in the 1800s. Many of the names in New York and Pennsylvania originated with the German Palatines (called Pennsylvania Dutch), who immigrated in the 18th century.

The entry of the United States into World War I was followed by anti-German sentiment, and local names were often changed to reflect this. Only one U.S. city with a German name has a population of greater than 100,000. Non-German city names with the suffix "-burg," which in English is partly an altered form the native English suffix -burgh and also partly derived from the related German word, "Burg," meaning "castle", is common for town and city names throughout the United States, such as Spartanburg, South Carolina and were not included.

See also 
 Amana Colonies, Iowa
 Germantown, Maryland
 Germantown, New York
 Germantown, Tennessee
 Leavenworth, Washington
 List of U.S. state name etymologies
 Lists of U.S. county name etymologies
 List of place names of French origin in the United States
 List of U.S. place names of Spanish origin
 List of non-US places that have a US place named after them

References

External links
 https://www.lonelyplanet.com/usa/travel-tips-and-articles/five-great-german-towns-in-the-usa/40625c8c-8a11-5710-a052-1479d2777cb1

German-American history
German
German language in the United States